Seconda Divisione 1924–25 was the lower championship of the Lega Nord.

Different from the higher championship, it was structured into four local groups.

Regulations 
It had four groups of ten clubs, with eighteen match days; however, the finals possessed four clubs and six match days.

Two of the participating teams were promoted to the First Division and the other two to test-matches.

There was one relegation in each group and a relegation tiebreaker for the penultimate teams.

Scandals 
Following an early match-fixing scandal, Virtus Bologna was found guilty and Mantua received a wild card for First Division.

Group A 
Novese 26
Valenzana 25
Rivarolese 25
Speranza 22
Sestrese 18
Savona 15
Astigiani 13
Vercellesi Erranti 13
Vado 12
Molassana 11

Molassana relegated.

Group B 
Como 26
Pro Patria 21
Biellese 20
US Milanese 19
Juve Italia 17
Monza 17
Lecco 16
Atalanta 16
Trevigliese 16
Esperia 12

Esperia relegated.

Group C 
Parma 25
Piacenza 12
Carpi 16
Libertas 16
Pistoiese 16
Fanfulla 14
Viareggio 14
Lucchese 12
Borgo San Donnino 9
Virtus Bologna (disqualified)

Virtus Bologna relegated; however, it soon went bankrupt. Borgo San Donnino lost a tie-breaker and soon went bankrupt.

Group D 
Udinese 23
Olympia Fiume 21
Venezia 19
Monfalcone 18
Gloria Fiume 17
Dolo 16
Triestina 14
Petrarca 10
Vicenza 6 (-13)

Vicenza was identified as guilty and began a trial against the FIGC; an agreement concerning the re-election of Vicenza was produced.

Final group 
Udinese 7
Parma 7
Novese 6
Como 4

Udinese and Parma were promoted.

References 

1924–25 in Italian football leagues
Serie B seasons